John Andrew Brewin (December 9, 1876 – March 7, 1938) was an American college football and baseball head coach for Davidson College in the early 1900s. He was the first official head coach for both teams in school history. Brewin also served as the Physical Director during his tenure at Davidson.

A native of Marlborough, Massachusetts, Brewin earned his medical degree from Davidson College in 1904. He had spent his undergraduate years at Boston College and lettered for the football team from 1893 to 1896, serving as team captain in 1895.  He died in Everett, Massachusetts on March 7, 1938.

Head coaching record

Football

Baseball

References

External links
 

1876 births
1938 deaths
19th-century players of American football
Boston College Eagles football players
Davidson Wildcats athletic directors
Davidson Wildcats baseball coaches
Davidson Wildcats football coaches
Sportspeople from Boston
Sportspeople from Everett, Massachusetts
Players of American football from Boston